The 1964–65 Scottish Division One was won by Kilmarnock on goal average, ahead of Hearts. Airdrieonians and Third Lanark finished 17th and 18th respectively and were relegated to the 1965-66 Second Division.

In one of the closest finishes ever seen in a league competition in Britain, Hearts played Kilmarnock at Tynecastle on the last day of the season, holding a two point lead over the Ayrshire club and a slightly better goal average. Kilmarnock had to beat Hearts by 2–0, or by a greater winning margin, to win the title. Any result better than a 2–0 defeat for Hearts, including other two goal losing margins where Hearts scored six goals or more (e.g. 6-8) would have made Hearts champions. Realistically, Kilmarnock needed to win by two clear goals, which was the result they achieved by defeating Hearts 2–0, giving them a goal average of 1.878 as against Hearts' 1.836. If goal difference had been the rule Hearts would have won the title. This was also the first and only time that neither of the Old Firm clubs finished in the top four of the top flight.

League table

Results

References

1
Scottish Division One seasons
Scot